Jürgen Becker (born August 27, 1959) is a German comedian, kabarett artist, and actor.

Life 
Becker was born and attended school in Cologne, Germany. He became a graphic designer in the German company 4711. Later Becker studied social science in Cologne.

In 1983, Becker was a founding member of Stunksitzung in Cologne, and he was its president from 1984 to 1995. Since 1992 Becker has performed in the television show Mitternachtsspitzen.

Filmography 

 Knockin’ on Heaven’s Door, 1997

References

External links 
 Jürgen Becker in German National Library
 Jürgen Becker in Internet Movie Database

German television personalities
German cabaret performers
German male comedians
Kabarettists
Actors from Cologne
1959 births
Living people